The Cut (formerly New Cut) is a street in London which runs between Waterloo Road in Lambeth and Blackfriars Road in Southwark, approximately parallel to the South Eastern Railway. The Old Vic theatre is at the western (Lambeth) end, and the more experimental Young Vic theatre halfway along on the other side. Lewisham Southwark College is sited on the south side of the Cut and at the eastern (Southwark) end is Southwark Underground station. Waterloo and Waterloo East stations are also nearby.

Street market
Lower Marsh and the Cut formed the commercial heart of the area from the early 19th century. Henry Mayhew estimated in the 1840s that 300 costermongers attended the market here. He described the scene in his work London Labour and the London Poor: 

The fortunes of the street market changed rapidly with time. In 1851 Mayhew wrote: "Since the above description was written, the New Cut has lost much of its noisy and brilliant glory. In consequence of a New Police regulation, "stands" or "pitches" have been forbidden, and each coster, on a market night, is now obliged, under pain of the lock-up house, to carry his tray, or keep moving with his barrow. The gay stalls have been replaced by deal boards, some sodden With wet fish, others stained purple with blackberries, or brown with walnut-peel; and the bright lamps are almost totally superseded by the dim, guttering candle. Even the pole under the tray or "shallow" is resting on the ground, the policeman on duty is obliged to interfere. The mob of purchasers has diminished one-half; and instead of the road being filled with customers and trucks, the pavement and kerb-stones are scarcely crowded."

The market in the Cut continued until the 1950s, when the street was designated as the B300 thoroughfare between Borough High Street and Westminster Bridge Road; the remaining traders moved to Lower Marsh where some street stalls continue (to 2019), or to new shops rebuilt on the bombed sites. 

A boxing gymnasium situated above a pub on the Cut is alleged to be where the modern rules for the sport of boxing were penned. The street is also now home to a range of restaurants, shops and offices.

References

Streets in the London Borough of Lambeth
Streets in the London Borough of Southwark
Restaurant districts and streets in England
History of the London Borough of Lambeth